Tryphon was a Greek grammarian.

Tryphon or Trypho may also refer to:

People
 Tryphon (Turkestanov) (1861–1934), hierarch of the Russian Orthodox Church
 Diodotus Tryphon (fl. 144–138 BC), Seleucid ruler
 Saint Tryphon (disambiguation), several saints
 Salvius Tryphon (fl. c. 100 BC), rebel slave
 Jewish philosopher Trypho (fl. 2nd century), in Dialogue with Trypho, who may be identical with the Rabbi Tarfon

Other
 Tryphon (play), a 1668 play by the Irish writer Roger Boyle
 Tryphon (wasp), a genus in the family Ichneumonidae
 Professor Calculus, a fictional character in The Adventures of Tintin
 Saint-Triphon, a Swiss village